Woollaston is a village in Staffordshire, England.

Woollaston may also refer to:
 Ben Woollaston (born 1987), English professional snooker player
 Philip Woollaston (born 1944), New Zealand politician
 Tatiana Woollaston (born 1986), professional snooker referee
 Toss Woollaston (1910–1998), New Zealand
 Woollaston baronets, a title in the Baronetage of Great Britain

See also
Woolaston, a village in the Forest of Dean, Gloucestershire, England
Woolston (disambiguation)